Apples (Malus species) are used as food plants by the caterpillars of a number of Lepidoptera (butterflies and moths). These include:

Bucculatricidae
Bucculatrix bechsteinella
Bucculatrix pomifoliella
 Coleophoridae
 Several Coleophora case-bearers, such as:
C. anatipennella – leaves – recorded on apple (M. pumila), and possibly others
C. cerasivorella
C. coracipennella
C. hemerobiella
C. malivorella
C. paripennella – recorded on apple (M. pumila)
C. pruniella
C. sacramenta – recorded on apple (Malus pumila)
C. serratella
C. spinella (apple-and-plum case-bearer)
 Geometridae
 Agriopis marginaria (dotted border)
 Campaea margaritata (light emerald)
 Chloroclystis rectangulata (green pug)
 Colotois pennaria (feathered thorn)
 Ectropis crepuscularia (engrailed)
 Epirrita autumnata (autumnal moth)
 Epirrita dilutata (November moth)
 Erannis defoliaria (mottled umber)
 Eupithecia exiguata (mottled pug)
 Eupithecia pusillata (juniper pug) – Americas only
 Eupithecia subfuscata (grey pug)
 Gymnoscelis rufifasciata (double-striped pug)
 Hemithea aestivaria (common emerald)
 Odontopera bidentata (scalloped hazel)
 Operophtera brumata (winter moth)
 Opisthograptis luteolata (brimstone moth)
 Peribatodes rhomboidaria (willow beauty) – leaves
 Selenia tetralunaria (purple thorn)
 Hepialidae
 Phymatopus behrensii
 Lymantriidae
 Euproctis chrysorrhoea (brown-tail)
 Euproctis similis (yellow-tail)
 Lymantria dispar (gypsy moth)
 Noctuidae
 Acronicta psi (grey dagger)
 Acronicta tridens (dark dagger)
 Agrotis segetum (turnip moth)
 Amphipyra pyramidea (copper underwing)
 Cosmia trapezina (dun-bar)
 Eupsilia transversa (satellite)
 Mamestra brassicae (cabbage moth)
 Naenia typica (gothic)
 Orthosia cerasi (common Quaker)
 Orthosia gothica (Hebrew character)
 Phlogophora meticulosa (angle shades)
 Xestia c-nigrum (setaceous Hebrew character)
 Nolidae
 Nola cucullatella (short-cloaked moth)
 Notodontidae
 Ptilodon capucina (coxcomb prominent)
 Nymphalidae
 Limenitis arthemis (American white admiral/red-spotted purple) – recorded on apple (Malus pumila)
 Saturniidae
 Pavonia pavonia (emperor moth)
 Sphingidae
 Laothoe populi (poplar hawk-moth)
 Smerinthus jamaicensis (twin-spotted sphinx) – recorded on European wild apple (M. sylvestris)
 Tortricidae
 Enarmonia formosana (cherrybark tortrix) – recorded on apple bark
 Epiphyas postvittana (light brown apple moth)
 Yponomeutidae
 Yponomeuta malinellus (apple ermine)
 Argyresthia curvella (apple blossom tineid) – only known from apple blossoms and perhaps rotting apple wood
 Scythropia crataegella (hawthorn moth) – recorded on European wild apple (M. sylvestris)

References

Malus
Malus